Hojedk (also Romanized as Hejdak) is a city and capital of Kuhsaran District, in Ravar County, Kerman Province, Iran.  At the 2006 census, its population was 938 in 232 families.

The town, which is nearly 700 miles southeast of the capital Tehran, has been hit by a major earthquake which resulted into several injuries, with casualties including damaged scores of buildings in remote mountainous villages near the town's epicenter. In 2017, the town has a population of 3,000. It is home to farms and coal mines and is reportedly frequently hit by quakes.

In December 2019, a 4.9 magnitude quake which struck at the depth of 10 kilometers (6.2 miles) rocked the village. There were no injuries nor damages reported.

References

Populated places in Ravar County
Cities in Kerman Province